Lew Eric Barnes (born December 27, 1962) is a former professional American football wide receiver who played three seasons in the National Football League (NFL) for the Chicago Bears, the Atlanta Falcons, and the Kansas City Chiefs.

Barnes played college football at the University of Oregon.

Barnes prepped at Lincoln High School in Southeast San Diego.

1962 births
Living people
Players of American football from Long Beach, California
American football wide receivers
Oregon Ducks football players
Chicago Bears players
Atlanta Falcons players
Kansas City Chiefs players
Frankfurt Galaxy players